Pentecostal Holy Temple Church of Jesus Christ, formerly known as The Free Baptist Church, was a historic Baptist church located at Elmira in Chemung County, New York.  It was built in 1882 and is an example of late 19th century Gothic Revival style ecclesiastical architecture. The building has been demolished.

It was listed on the National Register of Historic Places in 1998.

References

 
Churches on the National Register of Historic Places in New York (state)
Baptist churches in New York (state)
Gothic Revival church buildings in New York (state)
Churches completed in 1882
19th-century Baptist churches in the United States
Churches in Chemung County, New York
National Register of Historic Places in Chemung County, New York